Maria Lvova-Sinetskaya (1795 – 1875), was a Russian stage actress.  She was engaged at the Imperial Theatres in Moscow 1815-1860, during which she had a successful career and referred to as the elite of her profession of her generation. She played comedy and vaudeville and progressed to tragedy during her last years.

References

1795 births
1875 deaths
19th-century actresses from the Russian Empire
Russian stage actresses